Club Deportivo Vera is a Spanish football club based in Vera, Province of Almería, in the autonomous community of Andalusia. Founded in 1960 it currently plays in Divisiones Regionales de Fútbol in Andalusia, holding home games at Estadio Las Viñas, with a 7,000-seat capacity.

Season to season

8 seasons in Tercera División

Former players
 Chupe
 Gregorio

References

External links
Official website 
Futbolme team profile 

Football clubs in Andalusia
Association football clubs established in 1960
Divisiones Regionales de Fútbol clubs
1960 establishments in Spain